The Anglican Church in North America is a North American member province of the Global Fellowship of Confessing Anglicans (GAFCON). It is currently divided in 27 dioceses and two special jurisdictions or missionary districts. There are numerous geographically based dioceses, non-geographical dioceses and networks. Many jurisdictions overlap with each other.

Each diocese or network has a bishop and sometimes suffragan or assistant bishops. The Anglican Network in Canada's chief bishop is a "moderator."

Dioceses

† indicates a special jurisdiction or missionary district
‡ indicates a pro-cathedral

See also
Anglican Church in North America
List of bishops of the Anglican Church in North America

References

Sources
AnglicanChurch.net
ACNA.org

ACNA